BCR Chișinău is a subsidiary  of Banca Comercială Română (BCR) in the Republic of Moldova, member of Erste Group. BCR Chișinău is one of the first foreign capital owned banks in Moldova, which is a member of an international financial group.

Profile 
BCR Chișinău started its activity on 22 October 1998 as a universal bank serving both companies and individuals, with a shareholder's capital of 24 million MDL, which was increased further to 728 130 000 MDL. Bank network comprises 2 branches, 1 agency and 40 ATMs located in Moldova.  BCR Chișinău serves both companies and individuals. The unique shareholder of BCR Chișinău is Banca Comercială Română, the biggest financial institution in Romania by total assets, loans and deposits portfolio.

Business lines
For individual persons, BCR Chișinău offers current account services, saving instruments, cards and attached services, loans, currency transfers, foreign exchange, Internet Banking, other services.

For businesses and organizations, BCR Chișinău offers financing solutions, investment instruments, trade finance, cross-border products, current operations, cards and attached services, Internet Banking, products for SMEs, forex operations, forward on exchange rate, other services.

Bank management
BCR Chișinău management is organized on two levels: executive management – Executive Committee, formed of 3 executive members and supervision – Supervisory Board, formed of 5 members, nonexecutives (are not involved in current company decisions).

The Executive Committee reports to the Supervisory Board and informs periodically about decisions taken.

References 
1. https://web.archive.org/web/20120921162911/http://bnm.md/md/list_licensed_banks_md

2. http://www.bancamea.md/banks/bcr

3. http://www.banks.md/banks/bcr-sa.html

4. http://www.securities.com/Public/company-profile/MD/BCR_CHISINAU_ro_3509209.html

Notes 
1. http://www.publika.md/bcr-chisinau-in-parteneriat-cu-asociatia-businessului-european_947481.html

2. http://www.publika.md/bcr-chisinau-sustine-ideile-de-afaceri-inovatoare_933081.html

3. https://web.archive.org/web/20120626023550/http://www.bizmedia.md/Banci/BCR-Chisinau-ofera-credite-cu-garantii-din-partea-statului.-VEZI-AICI-cum-e-posibil.html

4. http://www.european-times.com/sector/finance-consulting/bcr-chisinau/

5. http://www.slideshare.net/adrnord/bcr-chiinu-sa-membru-al-grupului-erste

External links 
 Official website
 Website BCR Romania

Banks of Moldova